Gioiosa Marea (Sicilian: Giujusa) is a comune (municipality) in the Metropolitan City of Messina in the Italian region Sicily, located about  east of Palermo and about  west of Messina.

Gioiosa Marea borders the following municipalities: Montagnareale, Patti, Piraino, Sant'Angelo di Brolo. The towns name translates to "Joyful Tide".

People
 Guido Natoli (1893–1966)

References

External links
 Official website

Cities and towns in Sicily